Denatonium, usually available as denatonium benzoate (under trade names such as Denatrol, BITTERANT-b, BITTER+PLUS, Bitrex, Bitrix, and Aversion) and as denatonium saccharide (BITTERANT-s), is the most bitter chemical compound known, with bitterness thresholds of 0.05 ppm for the benzoate and 0.01 ppm for the saccharide. 
It was discovered in 1958 during research on local anesthetics by MacFarlan Smith of Edinburgh, Scotland, and registered under the trademark Bitrex.

Dilutions of as little as 10 ppm are unbearably bitter to most humans. Denatonium salts are usually colorless and odorless solids, but are often traded as solutions. They are used as aversive agents (bitterants) to prevent inappropriate ingestion. Denatonium is used in denatured alcohol, antifreeze, preventive nail biting preparations, respirator mask fit-testing, animal repellents, liquid soaps, shampoos, and Nintendo Switch game cards to prevent accidental swallowing or choking by children. It is not known to pose any long-term health risks.

The name "denatonium" reflects the substance's primary use as a denaturant and its chemical nature as a cation, hence the New Latin suffix -onium.

Structure, synthesis, and physical properties 

Denatonium is a quaternary ammonium cation. It is a compound of a salt with an inert anion such as benzoate or saccharinate. It can be obtained by the quaternization of lidocaine, a popular anesthetic, with benzyl halides. It was synthesized for the first time in 1963 by reacting benzyl chloride with lidocaine. To obtain other salts, like the benzoate, the formed denatonium chloride is subjected to an anion exchange reaction with sodium benzoate in ethanol or to sodium hydroxide, and the resulting denatonium hydroxide is neutralized with benzoic acid. Other similar compounds are procaine and benzocaine.

One of the chemical names for the compound is lidocaine benzylbenzoate, although denatonium only denotes the quaternary ammonium cation species itself, and does not necessitate the benzoate counterion.

Biochemistry 

Denatonium in humans is recognized by eight distinct bitter taste receptors: TAS2R4, TAS2R8, TAS2R10, TAS2R39, TAS2R43, TAS2R16, TAS2R46, and TAS2R47, being by far the most sensitive to the compound.

Denatonium can act as a bronchodilator by activating bitter taste receptors in the airway smooth muscle.

Applications 
The bitterness of the compound guides most applications of denatonium. Denatonium benzoate is used to denature ethanol so that it is not treated as an alcoholic beverage with respect to taxation and sales restrictions. One designation in particular, SD-40B, indicates that ethanol has been denatured using denatonium benzoate.

Denatonium is commonly included in placebos used in clinical trials to mimic the bitter taste of certain medications.

Denatonium also discourages consumption of poisonous alcohols such as methanol and additives such as ethylene glycol. It is also added to many kinds of harmful liquids, including solvents (such as nail polish remover), paints, varnishes, toiletries and other personal care items, special nail polish for preventing nail biting, and various other household products. It is also added to less hazardous aerosol products (such as gas dusters) to discourage inhalant abuse of the volatile vapors.

In 1995, the U.S. state of Oregon required that denatonium benzoate be added to products containing sweet-tasting ethylene glycol and methanol such as antifreeze and windshield washer fluid to prevent poisonings of children and animals. In December 2012, U.S. manufacturers voluntarily agreed to add denatonium benzoate to antifreeze sold nationwide.

Animals are known to have different sensitivities to the effects of denatonium. It is used in some animal repellents (especially for such large mammals as deer).  It has been used to safeguard rat poisons from human consumption, as humans are able to detect denatonium at much lower concentrations than rodents.

Nintendo Switch game cards are coated in denatonium benzoate to prevent young children from consuming them.

See also 
 Amarogentin

References 

Benzoates
Benzyl compounds
Quaternary ammonium compounds
Bitter compounds
Safety